Nicolae Pascu Oțeleanu (6 January 1908 - 5 May 1970) was a Romanian football defender and manager and also a World War II veteran.

Life and career
Nicolae Oțeleanu played football as a defender at Sparta București, Sportul Studențesc București and Sporting Chişinău. He fought for the Romanian Armed Forces in World War II as a lieutenant colonel having achievements for which he was decorated. In 1953 he became a manager, managing to be the first manager that promoted Universitatea Craiova to the second division in 1954 and later to the first division in 1964. He was also the first manager that promoted Electroputere Craiova to the second division in 1968.

International career
Nicolae Oțeleanu appeared in one friendly game for Romania which ended with a 6–1 victory against Bulgaria, played on the Romcomit Stadium from Bucharest.

Honours

Military decorations
 Ordinul "Steaua României" cu spade şi panglici de Virtute Militară, clasa a V-a (Order "Star of Romania" with swords and ribbons of Military Virtue, 5th class) (1945)
 Medalia Eliberarea de sub jugul fascist  (Medal Liberation from the fascist yoke) (20 August 1947)
 Crucea cehoslovacă (The Czechoslovak Cross) (1947)
 Medalia Pentru Victoria asupra Germaniei în Marele Război de Apărare a Patriei (Medal for Victory over Germany in the Great Patriotic War) (1941–1945)

Manager
Universitatea Craiova
Divizia B: 1963–64
Electroputere Craiova
Divizia C: 1967–68

References

External links
Nicolae Oțeleanu manager profile at Labtof.ro

1908 births
1970 deaths
Romanian footballers
Romania international footballers
Association football defenders
FC Sportul Studențesc București players
Romanian football managers
CS Universitatea Craiova managers
Romanian people of World War II
Romanian military personnel of World War II
Sportspeople from Brăila